Regium may refer to:

 Reggio Calabria, town in Calabria, Italy; Latin name Regium
 Reggio Emilia, town in Emilia, Italy; Latin name Regium
 Regium Donum, an annual grant formerly voted by Parliament to augment the stipends of the Presbyterian clergy in Ireland
 Collegium Regium (disambiguation), Latin for King's College or Royal College

See also
 Regis (disambiguation) (Latin "of the king")
 Regius (disambiguation) (Latin "royal" masculine adjective)
 Regia (disambiguation) (Latin "royal" feminine adjective)
 Regnum (disambiguation) (Latin for "kingdom", see e.g. Kingdom (biology))